Earl of Granard is a title in the Peerage of Ireland. It was created in 1684 for Arthur Forbes, 1st Viscount Granard. He was a lieutenant-general in the army and served as Marshal of the Army in Ireland after the Restoration and was later Lord Justice of Ireland. He had already succeeded his father as second Baronet of Castle Forbes and been created Baron Clanehugh and Viscount Granard in 1675, also in the Peerage of Ireland. The Baronetcy, of Castle Forbes in county Longford, was created in the Baronetage of Nova Scotia on 29 September 1628 for his father, Arthur Forbes.

The first Earl's grandson, the third Earl, was an admiral in the Royal Navy. He was summoned to the Irish House of Lords through a writ of acceleration as Lord Forbes in his father's lifetime. He was succeeded by his son, the fourth Earl. He was a lieutenant-general in the Army. His grandson, the sixth Earl, was a general in the Army. In 1806 he was created Baron Granard, of Castle Donington in the County of Leicester, in the Peerage of the United Kingdom. This title gave the Earls an automatic seat in the House of Lords until the passing of the House of Lords Act 1999. On his death the titles passed to his grandson, the seventh Earl. He notably served as Lord Lieutenant of County Leitrim from 1856 to 1872. His son, the eighth Earl, was a soldier and Liberal politician. Lord Granard held junior office in the Liberal administrations of Sir Henry Campbell-Bannerman and H. H. Asquith and was also a member of the Senate of Southern Ireland and of the Senate of the Irish Free State.  the titles are held by his grandson, the tenth Earl, who succeeded his uncle in 1992.

The invented title of Viscount Forbes is used as a courtesy title for the Earl's heir apparent.

The family seat is Castle Forbes, near Newtownforbes, County Longford.

Forbes baronets, of Castle Forbes (1628)
Sir Arthur Forbes, 1st Baronet (died 1632)
Sir Arthur Forbes, 2nd Baronet (1623–1695) (created Earl of Granard in 1684)

Earls of Granard (1684)

Arthur Forbes, 1st Earl of Granard, 1st Viscount Granard, 1st Baron Clanehugh (1623–1695)
Arthur Forbes, 2nd Earl of Granard, 2nd Viscount Granard, 2nd Baron Clanehugh (–1734)
George Forbes, 3rd Earl of Granard, 3rd Viscount Granard, 3rd Baron Clanehugh (1685–1765)
George Forbes, 4th Earl of Granard, 4th Viscount Granard, 4th Baron Clanehugh (1710–1769)
George Forbes, 5th Earl of Granard, 5th Viscount Granard, 5th Baron Clanehugh (1740–1780)
George Forbes, 6th Earl of Granard, 6th Viscount Granard, 6th Baron Clanehugh (1760–1837)
George Arthur Hastings Forbes, 7th Earl of Granard, 7th Viscount Granard, 7th Baron Clanehugh (1833–1889)
Bernard Arthur William Patrick Hastings Forbes, 8th Earl of Granard, 8th Viscount Granard, 8th Baron Clanehugh (1874–1948)
Arthur Patrick Hastings Forbes, 9th Earl of Granard, 9th Viscount Granard, 9th Baron Clanehugh (1915–1992)
Peter Arthur Edward Hastings Forbes, 10th Earl of Granard, 10th Viscount Granard, 10th Baron Clanehugh (born 1957)

The heir apparent is the present holder's son Jonathan Peter Hastings Forbes, Viscount Forbes (born 1981).

See also
Lord Forbes
Forbes baronets

References

External links

Earldoms in the Peerage of Ireland
Noble titles created in 1684